The 16th Regiment Indiana Infantry was an infantry regiment in the Union Army during the American Civil War.  In August 1863, the regiment was converted to mounted infantry for the remainder of the war.

Service
The 16th Indiana Infantry was organized at Indianapolis, Indiana and initially served on a one-year enlistment from May 27, 1861 through August 19, 1862, and mustered again in August 19, 1862 for three years' service under the command of Colonel Thomas J. Lucas.

The regiment was attached to Manson's Brigade, Army of Kentucky. Captured and reorganized after the battle of Richmond, it was attached to 1st Brigade, 10th Division, Right Wing, XIII Corps, Department of the Tennessee, to December 1862. 1st Brigade, 1st Division, Sherman's Yazoo Expedition to January 1863. 1st Brigade, 10th Division, XIII Corps, Army of the Tennessee, to July 1863. 1st Brigade, 4th Division, XIII Corps, Department of the Tennessee, to August 1863, and Department of the Gulf to September 1863. Unattached Cavalry Division, Department of the Gulf, to November 1863. 1st Brigade, Cavalry Division, Department of the Gulf, to June 1864. 4th Brigade, Cavalry Division, Department of the Gulf, to August 1864. District of LaFourche, Department of the Gulf, to June 1865.

The 16th Indiana Infantry mustered out of service after June 30, 1865. Veterans and recruits were transferred to the 13th Indiana Cavalry.

Detailed service

Moved to Louisville, Kentucky, August 19, and to Richmond, Kentucky. Battle of Richmond, August 30. Regiment captured. Paroled and sent to Indianapolis. Exchanged November 1, 1862. Ordered to Memphis, Tennessee, November 20. Sherman's Yazoo Expedition December 20, 1862, to January 3, 1863. Expedition to Texas and Shreveport Railroad December 25–26. Chickasaw Bayou December 26–28. Chickasaw Bluff December 29. Expedition to Arkansas Post, Arkansas, January 3–10, 1863. Assault and capture of Fort Hindman, Arkansas Post, January 10–11. Moved to Young's Point, Louisiana, January 17–21. Duty there and at Milliken's Bend until April. Expedition to Greenville, Mississippi, and Cypress Bend, Arkansas, February 14–29. Action at Cypress Bend, Arkansas, February 19. Fish Lake, near Greenville, February 23. Movement on Bruinsburg, Mississippi, and turning Grand Gulf April 25–30. Battle of Port Gibson, Mississippi, May 1. Battle of Champion Hill May 16. Big Black River May 17. Siege of Vicksburg May 18-July 4. Assaults on Vicksburg May 19 and 22. Advance on Jackson, Mississippi, July 4–10. Siege of Jackson July 10–17. Duty at Vicksburg until August 24. Ordered to New Orleans, Louisiana, August 24. Regiment mounted and assigned to duty along eastern shore of the Mississippi, protecting transportation to New Orleans and points along the coast until October. Expedition to New and Amite Rivers September 24–29. Western Louisiana "Teche" Campaign October 3-November 30. Action at Grand Coteau November 3. Vermillionville November 8. Camp Piatt November 20. Ordered to New Orleans to refit. Action at Franklin February 22, 1864. Red River Campaign March 10-May 22. Advance from Franklin to Alexandria March 14–26. Bayou Rapides March 20. Henderson's Hill March 21. Monett's Ferry and Cloutiersville March 29–30. Crump's Hill April 2. Wilson's Plantation, near Pleasant Hill, April 7. Bayou de Paul Carroll's Mills April 8. Battle of Sabine Cross Roads April 8. Pleasant Hill April 9. Grand Ecore April 16. Natchitoches April 22. About Cloutiersville April 22–24. Cane River Crossing April 23. Alexandria April 28. Hudnot's Plantation May 1. Alexandria May 1–8. Retreat to Morganza May 13–20. Wilson's Landing May 14. Avoyelle's Prairie May 15. Mansure May 16. Morganza May 28. Ordered to report to General Cameron, and assigned to frontier and patrol duty in District of Lafourche, Department of the Gulf, until June 1865. Action at Berwick August 27, 1864. Expedition to Natchez Bayou August 30-September 2. Near Gentilly's Plantation September 1. Expedition to Grand Lake, Grand River, Lake Fosse Point, Bayou Pigeon, and Lake Natchez September 7–11. Labadieville September 8. Bayou Corn September 9. Expedition from Terre Bonne to Bayou Grand Caillou November 19–27. Bayou Grand Caillou November 23. Expedition from Morganza to Morgan's Ferry, Archafalaya River, December 13–14. Expedition from Brashear City to Amite River February 10–13, 1865. Expedition to Grand Glaze and Bayou Goula February 14–18 (Companies B, F, & K). Scout to Bayou Goula March 23–24 (Company K). Skirmish Grand Bayou April 4. Expedition to Bayou Goula April 19–25 (Companies B & K). Operations about Brashear City April 21–22. Skirmish Brown's Plantation May 11.

Casualties
The regiment lost a total of 297 men; 3 officers and 82 enlisted men killed or mortally wounded, 212 enlisted men due to disease.

Commanders
 Colonel Pleasant A. Hackleman
 Colonel Thomas J. Lucas
 Lieutenant Colonel John M. Orr - commanded at the battle of Arkansas Post; wounded in action
 Major James H. Redfield - commanded at the battle of Arkansas Post and during the siege of Vicksburg

See also

 List of Indiana Civil War regiments
 Indiana in the Civil War

References
 Dyer, Frederick H. A Compendium of the War of the Rebellion (Des Moines, IA: Dyer Pub. Co.), 1908.
 History of the Sixteenth Indiana Mounted Infantry, Giving a Reliable Account of Its Marches, Hardships and Battles, from Its Original Organization to the Present Time (New Orleans, LA: s.n.), 1864.
 Perry, Oran. Recollections of the Civil War (Indianapolis, IN: Historical Bureau of the Indiana Library and Historical Dept.), 1928.
Attribution

External links
 16th Indiana Infantry monument at Vicksburg

Military units and formations established in 1862
Military units and formations disestablished in 1865
Units and formations of the Union Army from Indiana
1862 establishments in Indiana